Dyron Patrick Nix (February 11, 1967 – December 15, 2013) was an American professional basketball player. During his pro club career, he played in the National Basketball Association (NBA), as well as in several pro leagues overseas.

College career
Nix attended Fort Walton Beach High, in Fort Walton Beach, Florida, where he played high school basketball. After high school, Dix, a 6'7" (2.01 m) tall, 210 pound (95 kg) small forward, played college basketball at the University of Tennessee. He played with the school's men's team, the Tennessee Volunteers, from 1985 to 1989. He was a two-time first team All-SEC performer, in 1988 and 1989. Nix averaged 21.6 points per game during his senior season.

Professional career
Nix was selected by the Charlotte Hornets, in the second round, with the 29th overall pick, of the 1989 NBA draft. Nix played only one year in the NBA, with the Indiana Pacers, during the 1989–90 season. He averaged 2.0 points per game, in 20 games played.

Personal life
Nix's daughter Cree, began her college basketball career at Lipscomb University, and then she transferred to the University of Illinois at Chicago.

Nix died of pneumonia, on December 15, 2013, in Atlanta. He died at the age of 46.

References

External links
College & NBA stats @ basketball-reference.com

1967 births
2013 deaths
20th-century African-American sportspeople
21st-century African-American people
African-American basketball players
ALM Évreux Basket players
American expatriate basketball people in France
American expatriate basketball people in Greece
American expatriate basketball people in Israel
American expatriate basketball people in Spain
American men's basketball players
Baloncesto Málaga players
BC Andorra players
Expatriate basketball people in Andorra
American expatriate basketball people in Andorra
Cantabria Baloncesto players
CB Peñas Huesca players
CB Valladolid players
Charlotte Hornets draft picks
Grand Rapids Hoops players
Indiana Pacers players
Irakleio B.C. players
Israeli Basketball Premier League players
Joventut Badalona players
Liga ACB players
Maccabi Tel Aviv B.C. players
Omaha Racers players
Rochester Renegade players
Small forwards
Sportspeople from Meridian, Mississippi
Tennessee Volunteers basketball players